Bernhard Baier (12 August 1912 – 26 April 2003) was a German water polo player who competed in the 1936 Summer Olympics.

He was part of the German team which won the silver medal. He played six matches including the final.

See also
 List of Olympic medalists in water polo (men)

External links
 

1912 births
2003 deaths
German male water polo players
Water polo players at the 1936 Summer Olympics
Olympic water polo players of Germany
Olympic silver medalists for Germany
Olympic medalists in water polo
Medalists at the 1936 Summer Olympics
Knights Commander of the Order of Merit of the Federal Republic of Germany